Harold Victor Hadley (1895-1977) was an Australian rugby league footballer who played in the 1920s.

Hadley was from Hurlstone Park, New South Wales and was a star in the AIF rugby league team that played in England during the First World War (1914-1918). He was graded at St. George team in the club's second season in the NSWRFL in 1922. He played three trial matches with the club before making his first and last appearance in the First grade team on 29 April 1922.

War service
Harold Hadley was a veteran of the great war. He enlisted in the AIF in 1915 and was a member of the 1st Battalion, 12th Reinforcement. 

Hadley died on 20 June 1977 at Hurlstone Park, New South Wales.

References

Australian rugby league players
Rugby league players from Sydney
Rugby league centres
St. George Dragons players
Australian military personnel of World War I
1895 births
1977 deaths